Trematosuchus is an extinct genus of trematosaurian temnospondyl within the family Trematosauridae from South Africa. It was first named by Haughton in 1915 as Trematosaurus sobeyi. It  was assigned to its own genus Trematosuchus by Watson in 1919.

Classification
Below is a cladogram from Steyer (2002) showing the phylogenetic relationships of trematosaurids:

See also

 Prehistoric amphibian
 List of prehistoric amphibians

References

Trematosaurines
Prehistoric amphibians of Africa
Fossil taxa described in 1919